A Regular Frankie Fan is a 2000 documentary film on the fans of The Rocky Horror Picture Show.  It was narrated by Paul Williams and written and directed by Scott Mabbutt.  The majority of the documentary was filmed at theaters screening The Rocky Horror Picture Show in and around Southern California.  It was released on DVD by Liberty International Entertainment in 2001.

External links

2000 documentary films
2000 films
Documentary films about fandom
Rocky Horror
Films shot in California
Films set in California